Jonah ben Abraham Gerondi (died 1264), also known as Jonah of Girona and Rabbeinu Yonah, was a Catalan rabbi and moralist, cousin of Nahmanides. He is most famous for his ethical work The Gates of Repentance.

Biography 
Much of what is known about his life comes from a responsum by Solomon ben Simon Duran, one of his descendants.

Jonah Gerondi came from Girona, in Catalonia (present-day Spain). According to his pupil, Hillel ben Samuel, Gerondi was the instigator of the public burning of Maimonides' writings by order of the authorities at Paris in 1233, and the indignation which this aroused among all classes of Jews was mainly directed against him. Subsequently (not forty days afterward, as a tradition has it, but in 1242) when twenty-four wagon-loads of Talmuds were burned at the same place where the philosophical writings of Maimonides had been destroyed, Gerondi saw the folly and danger of appealing to Christian ecclesiastical authorities on questions of Jewish doctrine, and publicly admitted in the synagogue of Montpellier that he had been wrong in all his acts against the works and fame of Maimonides.

As an act of repentance he vowed to travel to Israel and prostrate himself on Maimonides' grave and implore his pardon in the presence of ten men for seven consecutive days. He left France with that intention, but was detained, first in Barcelona and later in Toledo. He remained in Toledo, and became one of the great Talmudical teachers of his time. In all his lectures he made a point of quoting from Maimonides, always mentioning his name with great reverence. Gerondi's sudden death from a rare disease was considered by many as a penalty for not having carried out the plan of his journey to the grave of Maimonides. However, some believe this was only a myth created by the followers of Maimonides. He died in Toledo in the Kingdom of Castile in November 1263. The text of his tombstone was later transcribed by Samuel David Luzzatto, with the month and possibly the day of his death being readable.

Works 
Gerondi left many works, of which only a few have been preserved. The  originally covered the entire work of Alfasi, but only the portion mentioned has been preserved. His novellæ on the first-named tractate have since been published under the name  while those on the last-named tractate form part of the collection of commentaries on the Talmud by ancient authors published by Abraham ben Eliezer ha-Levi under the title . The work  is wrongly attributed to Gerondi. A commentary by him on Proverbs, which is very highly praised (see Bahya ben Asher's preface to his commentary on the Pentateuch), exists in manuscript.

The fame of Gerondi chiefly rests on his moral and ascetic works, which, it is surmised, he wrote to atone for his earlier attacks on Maimonides and to emphasize his repentance. All have been reprinted many times, separately and together, as well as numerous extracts from them; they have also been translated into Yiddish and English. For an estimate of Gerondi's ethical works and his partial indebtedness to the  see .

References 

 Its bibliography:
Moritz Steinschneider, Cat. Bodl. No. 5859;
Zevi Hirsch Edelmann, Hemdah Genuzah, No. 6 (letters of R. Hillel of Verona), Königsberg, 1856;
Heinrich Grätz, Gesch. vol. vii., Index;
Julius Fürst, Bibl. Jud. i. 327–328;
David Conforte, Kore ha-Dorot, pp. 37–38, Berlin, 1845;
Azulai, Shem ha-Gedolim, ed. Benjacob, pp. 75–76;
Gustav Karpeles, Gesch. der Jüdischen Literatur, pp. 621 et seq.;
Winter and Wünsche, Jüdische Literatur, ii. 425–426, Treves, 1894;
Fuenn, Keneset Yisrael, pp. 448–449, Warsaw, 1886;
Heimann Joseph Michael, Or ha-Ḥayyim, No. 1038, Frankfort-on-the-Main, 1891

External links 
Shaarei Teshuvah
 Sefer HaYirah Vilna print
Sefer HaYirah Warsaw print
Commentary on Proverbs
Sefer HaYirah, Iggeret HaTeshuvah, Sod HaTeshuvah, Korban Taanis, Derashat HaNashim.
Yesod HaTeshuva Free English Translation

13th-century Catalan rabbis
1263 deaths
Rabbis from Girona
Year of birth unknown
Writers of Musar literature
Authors of books on Jewish law